Alpha House is an American political satire streaming television series produced by Amazon Studios. The show starred John Goodman, Clark Johnson, Matt Malloy, and Mark Consuelos as four Republican U.S. Senators who share a house in Washington, D.C. It was created by Doonesbury creator Garry Trudeau. The show premiered on Amazon Prime Video on April 19, 2013.

The series is inspired by several real Democratic Senators who share a row house in Washington D.C.  The series has a number of cameos from celebrities such as Bill Murray (as Senator Vernon Smits) and politicians such as Chuck Schumer as himself. Amazon Studios offered the first three episodes of Alpha House for free, with each subsequent episode released weekly thereafter for Amazon Prime members on Amazon Prime Video.

On February 11, 2014, the series was renewed for a second season. Production for the second season began filming in July 2014, and the entire second season became available on Amazon.com on October 24, 2014. The series was canceled after the second season.

Cast

Starring
 John Goodman as Gil John Biggs, a Republican U.S. Senator from North Carolina and former basketball coach of the North Carolina Tar Heels.
 Clark Johnson as Robert Bettencourt, a Republican U.S. Senator from Pennsylvania who is currently eighth in seniority.
 Matt Malloy as Louis Laffer, a Republican U.S. Senator from Nevada who owns the house where the four Senators live.
 Mark Consuelos as Andy Guzman, a Republican U.S. Senator from Florida and candidate for president.
 Yara Martinez as Adriana de Portago, Andy Guzman's girlfriend and Cuban-American heiress who runs a super PAC that assists Republican campaigns.
 Alicia Sable as Tammy Stackhouse, a legislative assistant to Senator Biggs.
 Julie White as Maddie Biggs, the demanding wife of Senator Biggs.

Recurring
 Bill Murray as Senator Vernon Smits, the senators' fifth roommate who is arrested in the pilot episode for multiple scandals (3 episodes, 2013–14)
 Haley Joel Osment as Shelby Mellman, a reporter from Reno, Nevada (12 episodes, 2013–14)
 Amy Sedaris as Louise Laffer, the wife of Senator Laffer (14 episodes, 2013–14)
 Wanda Sykes as Sen. Rosalyn DuPeche (D-IL), the senators' next-door neighbor and the Chair of the Senate Armed Services Committee (14 episodes, 2013–14)
 Brooke Bloom as Julie Carrell, Senator Laffer's Chief of Staff (18 episodes, 2013–14)
 Kobi Libii as Aaron Stimson, a legislative aide to Senator Bettencourt (7 episodes, 2013–14)
 Ben Rameaka as James Whippy, Senator Laffer's social media aide (17 episodes, 2013–14)
 Bjorn Dupaty as Hakeem Agabi, body man to Senator Biggs and one of his former players (5 episodes, 2013)
 Willa Fitzgerald as Lola Laffer, Senator Laffer's daughter (12 episodes, 2013–14)
 Lila Newman as Charlotte "Cee" Biggs, Senator Gil John Biggs' daughter (6 episodes, 2014)
 Natalie Gold as Katherine Sims, Senator Guzman's chief of staff (15 episodes, 2013–14)
 Sofiya Akilova as Marta Stjepanovi-Majdandzic, the Senators' Croatian housekeeper and mistress of Senator Guzman (7 episodes, 2013–14)
 Tony Plana as Benito "Benny" López, Adriana's aide (6 episodes, 2013–14) 
 Richard Cox as Graydon Talbot, a spin doctor counseling Senator Guzman (9 episodes, 2013–14)
 Owen Campbell as Dilly DeSantis, loosely based on the young data scientists that worked on the Barack Obama presidential campaign in 2012 (3 episodes, 2013–14)
 Molly Kate Bernard as Angie Sullivan, a videographer working for the Republican Party Chair (4 episodes, 2013–14)
 Lee Tergesen as Col. Eugene Drake, a gay army commander who intrigues Louis (3 episodes, 2014)
 William Thomas Evans as Senator Lamar Farkus (R-DE) (9 episodes, 2013–14)
 Cynthia Nixon as Sen. Carly Armiston (D-NY), the chair of the Senate Ethics Committee (6 episodes, 2013)
 Kenneth Tigar as Sen. Paul Mower, (R-ID) (5 episodes, 2013–14)
 Marylouise Burke as Sen. Betty Mower (R-ID), widow of Sen. Paul Mower (4 episodes, 2013–14)
 Janel Moloney as Sen. Peg Stanchion (R-ND), Libertarian activist and member of the Tea Party (4 episodes, 2014)
 Bianca Amato as Sen. Alice Graves (R-ME) (2 episodes, 2014)
 Bob Balaban as Sen. Elliot Robeson (D-CA) (2 episodes, 2014)
 Lucy DeVito as Charity Robeson, daughter of Senator Robeson (4 episodes, 2014)
 Anita Petry as Camila Perez, a Spanish Professor visiting from Barcelona (3 episodes, 2013)
 Chance Kelly as Bo Carthage, the CEO of a private military contractor (2 episodes, 2013)
 Matty Blake as Captain Brandon Carshaw, Ret. (2 episodes, 2013)
 Wendy Makkena as Molly P. Andresun (2 episodes, 2014)
 Tracy Howe as Colonel Wozniak (2 episodes, 2013)
 Ted King as Al Hickok, a Tea Party activist running for Senator Laffer's seat during the primaries (2 episodes, 2013)
 Penn Jillette as a fictionalized version of himself, running as the Democratic candidate for Laffer's Senate seat (5 episodes, 2014)
 Ed Rendell as a fictionalized version of himself, running as the Democratic candidate for Robert Bettencourt's Senate seat (2 episodes, 2014)
 Matthew Humphreys as Colonel Leland Grimmel, a war hero and former basketball player running as the Democratic candidate for Senator Biggs' Seat (4 episodes, 2014) 
 Todd Susman and Lee Wilkof as the Watt Brothers, wealthy casino owners and businessmen from Nevada funding Louis Laffer and Gil John Biggs (4 episodes, 2013–14)
 Tamara Tunie as Eve Bettencourt, Robert Bettencourt's divorced wife (2 episodes, 2014)

Cameos

 Stephen Colbert
 Chris Matthews
 Joe Scarborough
 Mika Brzezinski
 Michael Steele
 Chuck Schumer
 Dick Morris
 Anthony Weiner
 Grover Norquist
 Tom Brokaw
 Chris Jansing
 Matt Lauer
 Jane Pauley
 Kelly Ripa
 Michael Strahan
 Rachel Maddow
 Jon Ralston
 Elizabeth Warren
 John McCain
 David Axelrod
 Bradley Whitford
 Jake Tapper
 Andy Cohen

Episodes

Season 1 (2013–14)

Season 2 (2014)
On February 11, 2014, the series was renewed for a second season. Production for the second season began filming in July 2014, and the entire season premiered on Amazon.com on October 24, 2014.

Production 
Filming took place on stages at Kaufman Astoria Studios in Queens. ADR recording was done at Cherry Beach Sound in Toronto.

Broadcast
In Australia, where Prime Video was not yet available, the series premiered on SoHo on July 14, 2014, and returned for season two on February 26, 2015.

Reception
Reaction to Alpha House has been generally positive. Metacritic gives season 1 an average rating of 68/100 based on reviews from 21 critics. Rotten Tomatoes gives season 1 a score of 76% based on reviews from 38 critics. Rotten Tomatoes gives season 2 a score of 83% based on reviews from 6 critics.

Awards and nominations

References

External links
 
Alpha House on Amazon.com

2010s American political comedy television series
2010s American satirical television series
2010s American workplace comedy television series
2013 American television series debuts
2014 American television series endings
Amazon Prime Video original programming
Television shows filmed in New York City
Television shows set in Washington, D.C.
Television series by Amazon Studios